Opuntia anahuacensis is a cactus species in the genus Opuntia of the family Opuntioideae. It grows along the Gulf Coast of Texas, and perhaps northern Mexico. The plants are short, perhaps 1- or 2-ft tall, but they are wide. Some thickets may be 20- to 40-ft across and composed of multiple plants. The fruit is purplish. The cladodes are uniquely shaped, obovate with a neck. The original description claimed the plants were yellowish green, but they may be green or rarely blue-green.

As with any largish Opuntia in the USA, O. anahuacensis has been mistaken for other species. It is commonly misidentified as O. lindheimeri and less commonly as O. bentonii.

References

External links
Opuntia anahuacensis photo gallery at Opuntia Web

anahuacensis